The sixth season of Australian reality television series House Rules began airing on 7 May 2018 and ended airing on 30 July 2018. The series was produced by the team who created the Seven reality show My Kitchen Rules and was hosted by Johanna Griggs.

Season 6 was confirmed in June 2017 with Applications for the sixth season of House Rules open between 3 June & 31 August 2017 on the House Rules official network seven website. Season 6 was officially confirmed in October 2017.

This season of House Rules consisted of new teams renovating each other's homes and further challenges for the ultimate prize of $355,000.

Format Changes
Teams - This is the first season to include seven teams instead of the conventional six teams like in previous seasons.

Prize Money/Auction House - In a House Rules first, the first challenge of the competition was for the contestants to renovate a home which will be sold at auction, the profit that is made from the auction became the series prize money. The house was bought for $1.25 million and sold at auction for $1.605 million, which made the profit from the auction $355,000, which became the prize money for the winners of the season.

House Evaluation - After each interior renovation, a property expert from Purplebricks valued each teams houses, they told the team evaluation of the house before the renovation was complete and then give them a card with the new evaluation. In the grand final, the final two contestants were given a new evaluation after the renovation of their front yards.

Garden Rounds - The gardens rounds placed in the backyards of the homeowners yards and included six teams unlike previous seasons where it took place in the back and front yards and would only be four teams. It was also held over 3 rounds instead of two and for the first time the homeowners also scored the teams.

Give Back Makeover - Chelsea and Wayde applied into this series, but the latter died from a head injury that was initialised by a cliff fall. This round wa devoted to renovating Chelsea's house as an act of kindness. Even though their house would be renovated had Wayde not died, this format change is temporary (only for this season). The remaining teams did an interior renovation and got a score out of 10 from each of the judges. The lowest scoring team was eliminated and the 2 other teams headed into the final.

Contestant Teams

This season of House Rules introduced seven new teams. All teams are from different states in Australia.

Elimination history

Competition Details

Phase 1: Auction House

 Episode 1 & 2
 Airdate — 7 & 8 May
 Description — In the first challenge, the teams had seven days to renovate a house which will be put up for auction. The house located in Rosebery, New South Wales was bought for $1.25 million, the profit made from the auction became the series prize money ($355 000). The teams had to follow the rules given by the judges.

Phase 2: Interior Renovation
The seven teams traveled around the country to completely renovate each other's home. Every week, one team handed over their house to their opponents for a complete interior transformation. A set of rules from the owners were given to the teams known as the 'House rules' which needed to be followed to gain high scores from the judges and the homeowner team.

South Australia: Jess & Jared
 Episodes 3 to 6
 Airdate — 9 to 14 May
 Description —Teams headed to Jess & Jared's home in Adelaide, South Australia for the first renovation.

Notes
* Josh & Brandon received the bonus room and decided to keep it. The bonus room was a Movie Room. Jess & Jared judged it as a pass and the team gained 5 points, meaning their score of 23 rose to 28 taking them from 2nd place to 1st place.

Queensland: Mel & Dave
 Episodes 7 to 10
 Airdate — 15 to 21 May
 Description —Teams headed to Dave & Mel's home in Hope Island, Queensland for the second renovation. Two of the bedrooms belong to their children; Billy, three years old & Westin, five years old. 
Previous winner's advantage: Josh & Brandon — Ability to allocate the bonus room to another team or keep it for themselves
Previous loser's disadvantage: Leigh & Kristie — Camping in a tent during the renovation.

Notes
* Josh & Brandon had the power of the bonus room to keep it or give it to another team, they decided to give it to Toad & Mandy. The bonus room was an Outdoor Dining Room. Mel & Dave judged it as a pass and the team gained 5 points, meaning their score of 23 rose to 28 taking them from 5th place to 2nd place.

Queensland: Josh & Brandon
 Episodes 11 to 14
 Airdate — 22 to 28 May
 Description —Teams headed to Josh & Brandon's home in Maryborough, Queensland for the third renovation.
Previous winner's advantage: Kim & Michelle — Ability to allocate the bonus room to another team or keep it for themselves
Previous loser's disadvantage: Chiara & David — Camping in a tent during the renovation.

{| class="wikitable plainrowheaders" style="text-align:center; font-size:90%; width:65em;"
|+ Renovation 3
! colspan="8"  | Maryborough, Queensland
|-
! colspan="8"| House Rules
|-
! Rule 1
| colspan="8" style="background:#71C124"|  
|-
! Rule 2
| colspan="8" style="background:#71C124"| 
|-
! Rule 3
| colspan="8" style="background:#71C124"| 
|-
! Rule 4
| colspan="8" style="background:#71C124"| 
|-
! Rule 5
| colspan="8" style="background:#71C124"| {{nowrap|''Style Brandon's room 'modern bushman}}
|-
! Bonus Room Rule
| colspan="8" style="background:#71C124"| 
|- style="border-top:3px solid #aaa;"
! rowspan="2"| Team
! rowspan="2" style="width:40%;"| Zone
! colspan="4" style="width:40%;"| Scores
! rowspan="2" style="width:10%;"| 
! rowspan="2" style="width:10%; border-left:3px solid #aaa;"| 
|-
! style="width:10%;"| Homeowner
! style="width:10%;"| Drew
! style="width:10%;"| Laurence
! style="width:10%;"| Wendy
|-
| style="width:15%;"| 
| 
| 7 || 8 || 7 || 8
| 
| style="border-left:3px solid #aaa;"| 94 / 150|-
| style="width:15%;"| 
| 
| 8 || 6 || 5 || 8
| 27| style="border-left:3px solid #aaa;"| 93 / 150|-
| style="width:15%;"| 
| 
| 7 || 7 || 6 || 6
| 26| style="border-left:3px solid #aaa;"| 100 / 150|-
| style="width:15%;"| 
| 
| 6 || 7 || 5 ||7
| 25| style="border-left:3px solid #aaa;"| 73 / 110|-
| style="width:15%;"| 
| 
| 7 || 5 || 5 || 7
| 24| style="border-left:3px solid #aaa;"| 98 / 150|-
| style="width:15%;"| 
| 
| 8 || 6 || 4 || 7
| style="background:pink"| 
| style="border-left:3px solid #aaa;"| 61 / 110|-
| style="width:15%;"| 
| colspan="6" 
| style="border-left:3px solid #aaa;"| 73 / 110|-
|}

Notes
* Kim & Michelle had the power of the bonus room to keep it or give it to another team, they decided to give it to Mel & Dave. The bonus room was a Music Room. Josh & Brandon judged it as a fail and the team lost 5 points, meaning their score of 25 dropped to 20 taking them from 5th place to last place.

New South Wales: Kim & Michelle
 Episodes 15 to 18 Airdate — 29 May to 4 June
 Description —Teams headed to Kim & Michelle's home in Tweed Heads, New South Wales for the fourth renovation. One of the bedrooms belong to Kim and her husband (the master bedroom), one to Michelle, one to her sister Melissa, one to Michelle's children (daughters who are 7 and 6 - Bella and Aaliyah respectively), and one to Melissa's son (10 year old Corey).
Previous winner's advantage: Chiara & David — Ability to allocate the bonus room to another team or keep it for themselves
Previous loser's disadvantage: Mel & Dave — Camping in a tent during the renovation, however due to the high possibility of snakes they were able to book a hotel room for the week

Notes
* Chiara & David had the power of the bonus room to keep it or give it to another team, they decided to keep it. The bonus room was a Kids' Playroom. Kim & Michelle judged it as a pass and the team gained 5 points, meaning their score of 33 rose to 38 and came in first place.

Victoria: Leigh & Kristie
 Episodes 19 to 22 Airdate — 5 to 11 June
 Description —Teams headed to Leigh & Kristie's home in Rye, Victoria for the fifth renovation. Two of the bedrooms belong to their children; Billie, four years old & Kobe, six years old. 
Previous winner's advantage: Chiara & David — Ability to allocate the bonus room to another team or keep it for themselves
Previous loser's disadvantage: Josh & Brandon — Camping in a tent during the renovation.

Notes
* Chiara & David had the power of the bonus room to keep it or give it to another team, they decided to give it to Mel & Dave. The bonus room was a Guest Bedroom. Leigh & Kristie judged it as a pass and the team gained 5 points, meaning their score of 33 rose to 38 moving them from second place to first place.

Western Australia: Chiara & David
 Episodes 23 to 26 Airdate — 12 to 18 June
 Description —Teams headed to Chiara & David's home in Yangebup, Western Australia for the sixth renovation. Three of the bedrooms belong to their children; Seth, eight years old, Taya, six years old & Ellie Mae, three years old. 
Previous winner's advantage: Mel & Dave — Ability to allocate the bonus room to another team or keep it for themselves
Previous loser's disadvantage: Kim & Michelle — Camping in a tent during the renovation.

Notes
* Mel & Dave had the power of the bonus room to keep it or give it to another team, they decided to give it to Leigh & Kristie. The bonus room was Seth's Bedroom. Chiara & David judged it as a fail and the team lost 5 points, meaning their score of 28 fell to 23 moving them from fourth place to last place.

New South Wales: Toad & Mandy
 Episodes 27 to 30 Airdate — 19 to 25 June
 Description —Teams headed to Toad & Mandy's home in Candelo, New South Wales for the seventh & final interior renovation. Two of the bedrooms belong to their 18 month old twins, Lenny & Layla. The lowest scoring team overall will be eliminated.
Previous winner's advantage: Mel & Dave — Although Toad & Mandy were the highest scoring team in the previous week, they do not participate in the renovation of their own home, therefore the team to allocate the bonus room to another team or keep it for themselves was given to the second-highest scorer.
Previous loser's disadvantage: Leigh & Kristie — Camping in a tent during the renovation.

Notes
* Mel & Dave had the power of the bonus room to keep it or give it to another team, they decided to give it to Kim & Michelle. The bonus room was a Sitting Room. Toad & Mandy judged it as a pass and the team gained 5 points, meaning their score of 25 rose to 30 moving them from last place to fourth place.

Phase 3: Gardens & Backyards

The 6 remaining teams were challenged to transform the gardens & backyards of each other's homes. Two teams were allocated to a home (that belonged to neither of them) whilst the homeowners are away for the duration of the renovation and had to renovate a zone in the backyard, as well as improve the house exterior. They were held over three rounds, covering all houses of the current teams. After all rounds were complete, the three lowest scoring teams were eliminated.

Round 1

 Episodes 31 to 34 Airdate —  26 June to 2 July
 Description — In round 1 of the exterior renovations, 4 teams headed to Maryborough and Hope Island to transform the gardens and backyards in 4 Days. Teams were allocated to a zone in the back yard of either Josh & Brandon's or Mel & Dave's.

Round 2

 Episodes 35 to 38 Airdate —  3 to 9 July
 Description — In round 2 of the exterior renovations, 4 teamsed head to Candelo and Yangebup to transform the gardens and backyards in 4 Days. Teams were allocated to a zone in the back yard of either Toad & Mandy's or Chiara & David's.

Round 3

 Episodes 39 to 42 Airdate — 10 to 16 July
 Description — In round 3 of the exterior renovations, 4 teams headed to Adelaide and Tweed Heads to transform the gardens and backyards in 4 Days. Teams weare allocated to a zone in the back yard of either Jess & Jared's or Kim & Michelle's. In a House Rules first, the three lowest scoring teams overall were eliminated.

Phase 4
Give Back Makeover

 Episodes 43 to 45 Airdate — 22 to 24 July
 Description — The 3 remaining teams headed to Woonona, New South Wales, namely the home of Chelsea and her 17 month old daughter, Koa. Chelsea & her husband Wayde had applied for the series and were successful, however Wayde passed away after an accident whilst fishing. The lowest scoring team was eliminated & the top 2 advanced into the Grand Final.
Previous winner's advantage: Mel & Dave — Ability to allocate the bonus room to another team or keep it for themselves

Notes
* Mel & Dave received the bonus room and decided to keep it. The bonus room was a Back Deck. Wendy and Laurence judged it as a pass and the team gained 5 points, meaning their score of 24 rose to 29 causing them to move to first place and Chiara & David to be eliminated.

Grand Final

 Episode 46 Airdate — 30 July 
 Description''' — The final 2 teams had 4 days to renovate their opponent's front yard. The team that received the highest score won the season (thus becoming House Rules 2018 Champion) and received $355,000.

Ratings
 Colour key:
  – Highest number of viewers/nightly rank during the season
  – Lowest number of viewers/nightly rank during the season

Notes
Ratings data used is from OzTAM and represents the live and same day average viewership from the 5 largest Australian metropolitan centres (Sydney, Melbourne, Brisbane, Perth and Adelaide).
Melbourne, Adelaide & Perth only
Sydney & Brisbane only
Not in the top 20
Nightly rank was the lowest for this season.

References

2018 Australian television seasons